Ibrahim Mohamed Fayad (8 May 1931 – 31 January 2008) was an Egyptian senior pediatrician and a Professor of Pediatrics at Kasr Al Aini School of Medicine, Cairo University.

Fayad's major achievements may be summarised:
 modifying of WHO-ORS for treatment of diarrhea dehydration
 establishing the Egyptian Society of Pediatric Gastroenterology, Hepatology & Nutrition (EGSPGHAN) in 1991
 founding the Pan-Arab Union of Pediatric Gastroenterology, Hepatology & Nutrition in 1998, which led to the founding of similar societies in many Arab countries
 establishing the Egyptian Society of Child & Environment in 1994
 establishing the Pan-Arab Union Child & Environment in 2000
 addressing many important health problems among Egyptian & Arab children such as zinc deficiency, aflatoxin toxicity, celiac disease and many others, which were discussed at the societies' annual conferences
 designing the Rehydro-Zinc formula in association with the pharmaceutical company CID that is currently available on the Egyptian market

Early Life 
Fayad was born on 8 May, 1931 in El-Mahalla El-Kubra Gharbia. He was the son of a science teacher and Undersecretary of the Ministry of Education during the era of Dr. Taha Hussein, and the brother of Dr. Mohamed Fayad. He studied at Cairo University and qualified as a doctor in 1953.

Other Activities and Achievements 
 Dr. Fayad served as a consultant & a board member of many national & international organizations such asthe  National Project of Diarrheal Diseases Control, International Association of Maternal & Neonatal Health, Egyptian Pediatric Association and WHO.
 He collaborated with many national & international bodies on research and projects in addition to many multicenter studies with Egyptian universities.
 He has over 40 publications published in peer-reviewed journals such as The Lancet, Journal of Tropical Pediatrics, New England Journal of Medicine, Journal of International Federation of Clinical Chemistry, Journal of Pediatrics, Journal of Endocrinology & Metabolism, and many other journals.

Curriculum Vitae 
 1953 Medical Bachelor, Cairo (Egypt)
 1956 Master of Pediatrics, Cairo (Egypt)
 1959 Master of Internal Medicine, Cairo (Egypt)
 1959 MD pediatrics, Cairo (Egypt)
 1961 Master of Biochemistry & pharmacology, Cairo (Egypt)
 1984-2008– Associate Professor in the Department of International Health, Johns Hopkins, Baltimore, Maryland, USA from 1984 to 2008
        – Professor of Pediatrics, Cairo University
        – Director of Gastroenteritis Unit, Cairo University Children's Hospitals

References

External Links 
 
 

Egyptian pediatricians
People from Gharbia Governorate
Knights Bachelor
1931 births
2008 deaths